The San Diego International Fringe Festival is a non-profit fringe theatre festival project of conTACT ARTS, in association with the Actors Alliance of San Diego, designed to help provide a platform for artists while also helping the community as a whole - boosting arts and culture within the City of San Diego.

During the festival, artists from across the United States and around the world participate alongside home-grown talent in art forms including theater, buskers/street performers, cabaret, comedy, circus, dance, film, poetry, spoken word, puppetry, music, visual art, design and other forms.

Key to the operation of San Diego International Fringe Festival is its role to support, encourage, and facilitate producers, artists, presenters, venues, and businesses. The festival works to ensure that artists and all participants involved have the best possible experience.

Features 
The San Diego International Fringe Festival provides Fringe-managed venues as well as the opportunity for artists to bring their own venues via BYOV (Bring Your Own Venue). Material presented can include site-specific works that take advantage of city features, as well as works staged in theaters, including San Diego REP's Lyceum Theatres and the Historic Spreckels Theatre.

The defining virtues of the festival are that it is open-access and uncensored, it is not juried, and 100% of its ticket income is given to the artists.

See also
 Hollywood Fringe Festival

References and external links 
 Official Website
 Canadian Association of Fringe Festival (CAFF) Listing
 United States Association of Fringe Festivals (USAFF) Listing
 KPBS 2015
 San Diego Story 2015
 SD Reader 2015
 Vanguard Culture 2015
 Voice of San Diego 2014
 Citybeat 2013
 Union Tribune 2013

Fringe festivals in the United States
Festivals in San Diego